Edwin Bennion Cannon (January 2, 1910 – November 12, 1963), sometimes referred to as Edwin B. Cannon, served as a member of the Utah Senate from 1951 to 1953. He was the grandson of Angus Munn Cannon.

1910 births
1963 deaths
Cannon family
Utah state senators
American people of Manx descent

20th-century American politicians